Upāya (उपाय) is a Sanskrit word that means "approaches" or "ideas", "to come into any state or condition" and "to come near or towards". It also refers to methods of diplomacy found in Hindu and Jain texts. 

Kautilya mentioned four Upayas - Sama, Dana or Dama, Danda and Bheda as ways to reach a solution in state politics to avoid conflicts and war situations (Arthashastra 2.10.47). This phrase is also commonly used when you need to find a solution to a problem anyhow. 

1. Sama, the first step, means conciliation or alliances. When conflict arises between states, the first step is to talk. There are five types of conciliations: praising the person, referring to a relationship (for example, marriage), pointing out common benefits, telling what might happen in future if something is done in a specific way, and lastly putting oneself at the other's disposal (Arthashastra 2.10.48-53).

2. Dana, the second, means gifts or compensation (Arthashastra 2.10.54). Sometimes it is referred to as Dama, price, which means to pay the value. 

3. Bheda, refers to the usage of logic or trickery, influencing the mind. Creating dissension and discord in the enemy (Arthashastra 2.10.55).

4. Danda refers to force or armaments. To take up war with the opposite state. This is the last resort - using military force. There are three types of Dandas: killing, tormenting and plundering (Arthashastra 2.10.56).

All of the above four Upayas are generally spoken together in a single colloquial phrase - "Sama Dana Bheda Dandopaya". This is a very common quote that is used all over India as a suggestion to resolve any conflict.

An article on Institute for Defense Studies and Analyses website states that the 20th-century power-politics theoretician Hans J. Morgenthau suggests four similar methods in a struggle for the balance of power: Divide and Rule; Compensation; Armaments; and Alliances.

These four approaches are found in the Hindu Itihasa (epics) and the Dharmasastras, as well as the Jain text Nitivakyamitra.

See also 
 Agni Purana
 Upaya- used in Buddhism to indicate the methods of Buddhas and Bodhisattvas
 Ahimsa

References 

Political theories